Suntan is a 2016 Greek drama film directed by Argyris Papadimitropoulos.  It stars Makis Papadimitriou as a middle-aged general practitioner on a resort island who becomes obsessed with a young female patient, played by Elli Tringou.  It premiered at the International Film Festival Rotterdam in February and was released in Greece in March 2016, where it grossed $145,858.

Plot 
Kostis, the new general practitioner, arrives on the resort island Antiparos, and greets the mayor.  The mayor tells that, outside of the summer months, the population is around 800 and life is quiet.  Kostis settles in amid Christmas celebrations, meeting several people, among them Takis, a villager who crudely assures him that the island will be overflowing with hedonistic young women during the summer.

The summer comes along and Kostis treats a young tourist named Anna, who has injured her leg.  Her friends – Alin, Mila, Jason, and Morten – insist on accompanying her into the examination room and behave obnoxiously.  Kostis humors them and asks Anna several questions while filling out paperwork. Anna playfully turns the questions on Kostis, who admits that he is twice her age, 21.  Before leaving, Anna suggests Kostis come with them to the beach.

Kostis leaves for the beach after he is done at work.  Overweight and balding, Kostis stands out at the nude beach even more for having arrived fully dressed.  After taking off some of his clothing, he makes a pretense toward asking Anna and her friends if they have a lighter.  Recognizing him, they invite him to join them.  Kostis watches as they frolic nude on the beach, later joining them in the water.  When he swims over to Anna and asks how her leg is, she demonstrates by diving underwater and spreading her legs in front of him while upside down.  Kostis, infatuated with Anna, begins hanging out at the beach after work and supplying her friends with free beer.  On one occasion, he turns away an elderly woman who has complained of back pain so he can leave for the beach as soon as his office closes.

At the beach, Anna invites him to join a pool party.  Though initially reluctant, Kostis chances upon Orestis, a former medical school colleague who is vacationing on the beach with his family.  Overhearing Kostis' invitation, he encourages Kostis to go, as the parties have a reputation for hedonistic abandon; Kostis agrees.  Once there, the host urges everyone to kiss whoever is near them.  The partiers make out with each other, in both heterosexual and homosexual couplings, though Kostis is only interested in Anna.  They start making out, but she turns to make out with others, leaving Kostis jealous.  Anna chastises him, and he wanders away from the party, dejected.  Orestis, who has also attended the party, consoles him, saying that such parties are not for middle-aged men such as them.

As Kostis spends more time ingratiating himself into Anna's company, the villagers complain about his behavior, such as turning away the elderly woman.  Eventually, Anna invites him to the beach with her alone, and the two have sex.  Ashamed at orgasming too quickly, Kostis apologizes.  Anna brushes it aside and says he will have much time over the summer to make it up to her.  However, Anna is nowhere to be found for the next few days.  Kostis spends the bulk of his time searching the beaches and bars for her, becoming increasingly frustrated and drunken.  Finding Kostis at a bar, Takis encourages him to carouse with him.  They pick up a female tourist, who eventually grows frustrated with Takis' sexually aggressive behavior.  Kostis stands up for her, annoying Takis, and she performs oral sex on Kostis to please him.

When Anna finally reappears, she happily jumps into his arms.  Angry, Kostis berates her for leaving the island without telling him.  When she becomes offended, he apologizes and professes his love for her, but she only becomes more adamant that she does not want to see him again.  Crushed, Kostis begins stalking her, watching covertly as she has sex.  When Kostis forcefully attempts to dance with her at a club, the bouncer throws him out.  As his life falls apart, Kostis comes in hours late to the clinic during an emergency.  The mayor, frustrated with Kostis' behavior, fires him.  Kostis sullenly becomes drunk, assaults one of Anna's friends, and kidnaps her.  After drugging her and dragging her unconscious body back to the clinic, he takes off her shorts but doesn't go through with raping her. Upon checking her pulse, he begins crying, then cleans the original wound on her leg, and starts to restitch it, still sobbing.

Cast 
 Makis Papadimitriou as Kostis
 Elli Tringou as Anna
 Hara Kotsali as Alin
 Milou Van Groessen as Mila
 Dimi Hart as Jason
 Marcus Collen as Morten
 Yannis Tsortekis as Takis
 Pavlos Orkopoulos as the mayor
 Syllas Tzoumerkas as Orestis

Release 
Suntan premiered at the International Film Festival Rotterdam on 2 February 2016.  It opened in Greece on 31 March 2016 and grossed $145,858.

Reception

Critical response 
Rotten Tomatoes, a review aggregator, reports that 75% of 24 surveyed critics gave the film a positive review; the average rating is 6.5/10.  Metacritic rated it 59/100 based on nine reviews.

Writing for Variety, Jay Weissberg described it as "an unflinching depiction of one man's descent into an embarrassing vortex of desire, paired with a spectacular lack of self-awareness".  Neil Young of The Hollywood Reporter wrote that it "wallows in the worst of human nature with little reward", becoming less plausible and increasingly difficult to find a sympathetic character as Kostis' midlife crisis worsens.  At Screen Daily, Wendy Ide wrote, "A deftly handled cautionary tale, there is a compulsive, creeping horror to this portrait of a man losing all self-respect."  In comparing the film to Death in Venice, Peter Bradshaw of The Guardian rated it 4/5 stars and called it "a superbly directed, quietly devastating film about an EasyJet Gustav von Aschenbach who embarrasses himself by falling in love with a younger beauty".  Glenn Kenny of The New York Times selected it as a "NYT Critics' Pick" and wrote that it "captures a set of specific feelings: the exhilaration and embarrassment of falling, followed by the desperate denial that one has landed in a very bad place".  The Los Angeles Times Gary Goldstein wrote, "Following a pathetic, self-destructive antihero who lacks redeeming values or emotional growth proves a thoroughly unsatisfying journey in the dismal Greek import Suntan."

Accolades 
Suntan won Best International Film at the Edinburgh International Film Festival and a Golden Duke for Best Acting at the Odessa International Film Festival.  In Greece, it won Best Film, Best Director, Best Screenplay, Best Actor (Makis Padimitriou), and Best Supporting Actress (Elli Tringou) at the Hellenic Film Academy Awards.

References

External links 
 

2016 films
2016 drama films
Greek drama films
English-language Greek films
2010s Greek-language films
Midlife crisis films
Films set in Greece
Films set on islands
2010s English-language films
2016 multilingual films
Greek multilingual films